Sichuan Agricultural University is a national public agricultural university in Ya'an, Sichuan with two satellite campuses in Chengdu, Sichuan, China. Emphasizing on agricultural and forestry studies, the university is sponsored by the Ministry of Education and the Sichuan Provincial Government. 

The university is part of Project 211 and the Double First Class University Plan.

History
Founded in 1906 as Sichuan Tong Sheng Agricultural School, it is the first public agricultural college in Sichuan Province. In 1935, it became a component of National Sichuan University. In 1956, it moved from Chengdu to Ya'an. In 1985, it was renamed as Sichuan Agricultural University.

Sichuan Agricultural University has its main campus located in Ya'an City and two satellite campuses in Wenjiang and Dujiangyan within Chengdu City, the provincial capital.

The university belongs to the Double First Class University Plan and former Project 211 in China.

Basic Profile

Campuses
With a total area of 4,500 mu (300 ha.) and an educational population of about 40,000, SAU consists of three branches, i.e. the base campus in Ya’an city, the Dujiangyan campus in Dujiangyan city and the Wenjiang campus in Chengdu.

Ya'an Campus is the main campus of Sichuan Agricultural University and covers an area equivalent to a quarter of the downtown of Ya'an City. Undergraduate and graduate programs are organized here.

The Dujiangyan Campus includes general and specialist undergraduate programs.

Located in Wenjiang District, Chengdu, Sichuan, Chengdu Campus covers an area of 600 acres.

Scientific Research Strength
The university governs 18 colleges and 10 research institutes. The university has 7 stations for post-doctoral research, 40 programs for doctoral degrees, 86 specialized programs for masters degrees and 74 for undergraduates. SICAU has 760 senior tutors for doctorate and master students. Among the 760 are 2 academicians of the Chinese Academy of Engineering, 5 national outstanding senior experts, one awardee of the “National Scientific Fund for Outstanding Young Fellows”, 7 national middle-aged and young experts awarded for their outstanding contribution to the country, 9 academic candidates of the national “Bai-Qian-Wan Talents Project” (100-1000-10,000 Talents Project) and one renowned teacher at the state level.

Colleges
Ya'an Campus
 College of Science
 College of Life Science
 College of Mechanical and Electrical Engineering
 College of Food Science
 College of Information Engineering
 College of Water Conservancy and Hydropower Engineering
 College of Marxism
 College of Literature and Law
 College of Arts and Sports
 College of Distance and Continuing Education
Dujiangyan Campus
 College of Architecture and Urban-Rural Planning
 College of Civil Engineering
 College of Tourism
 Business School
Chengdu Campus
 College of Agronomy
 College of Animal Science and Technology
 College of Veterinary Medicine
 College of Forestry
 College of Horticulture
 College of Resources
 College of Marxism
 College of Environmental Sciences
 College of Economics
 College of Landscape Architecture
 Rice Research Institute
 Triticeae Research Institute 
 Maize Research Institute 
 Animal Nutrition Institute

References

External links

Sichuan Agricultural University

Universities and colleges in Sichuan
Forestry education